Michaelhouse is a full boarding senior school for boys founded in 1896. It is located in the Balgowan valley in the Midlands of KwaZulu-Natal, South Africa.

History 
St. Michael's Diocesan College was founded in Pietermaritzburg in 1896 by James Cameron Todd, an Anglican canon. The school was established as a private venture with fifteen boys in two small houses in Loop Street.

James Cameron Todd had a clear idea of what he wanted the school to be. He wrote: "A man's tone, moral and spiritual, as well as intellectual, is largely determined for life by his school."

Within a few years, Michaelhouse became the Diocesan College of Natal, governed by a permanent trust deed and administered by a board of governors.

In 1901 the school relocated to Balgowan, when some 77 boys took up residence in the buildings which remain the core to the school to this day. Its name was later changed to Michaelhouse. The school adopted the 9th century chorale "Stars of the Morning" as its official school hymn.

Motto 
The Latin school motto, Quis ut Deus translates to 'Who like God?', or, less literally, 'Who is like God?'. This motto is derived from the name of the school whose origin stems from the Hebrew Mikha'el which translates to the same. The school hymn, Stars of the Morning, reflects this with the line Who like the Lord?' thunders Michael, the Chief."

Rectors 
James Cameron Todd (1896–1903)
Edward Bertram Hugh Jones (1903–1910)
Antony William Scudamore Brown (1910–1916)
Eldred Pascoe (1917–1926)
Warin Foster Bushell (1927–1930)
Ronald Fairbridge Currey (1930–1938)
Frederick Rowlandson Snell (1939–1952)
Clement Yorke Morgan (1953–1960)
Robert 'Tommy' Norwood (1960–1968)
Rex Frampton Pennington (1969–1977)
Neil Jardine (1978–1986)
John Hay Pluke (1987–1996)
Reginald Dudley Forde (1997–2001)
Guy Norman Pearson (2002–2012)
Gregory Theron (2013-2018)
Paul Christian Fleischack (2018-2019)
Antony Roy Clark (2019-)

Relationship with Hilton College 
Hilton College and Michaelhouse have enjoyed a long history of friendly rivalry. The two schools have much in common and are the only two full boarding schools remaining in KwaZulu-Natal. The schools are located near one another in the KwaZulu-Natal Midlands.

The bond between Hilton and Michaelhouse has developed since 1904 when the two schools played their first rugby match at Hilton College, which Hilton won 11-0. Both schools consider each other their main fixture in all sporting disciplines. The high point of this rivalry is the biannual Hilton-Michaelhouse Day. This event, held alternately between the two schools, sees them play one another in rugby and hockey. The culmination of the day is the main rugby match between the two schools' 1st XVs, which is the oldest continuous rugby fixture in Kwa-Zulu Natal.

Academics 
The years of study are referred to as blocks E to A. "A block" is the equivalent of grade 12 or year 12 and has boys aged 17 or 18 and "E block" is the equivalent of grade 8 or year 8 and has boys aged 13 or 14.

Michaelhouse educates boys and has an academic staff of about sixty with a male teaching quotient of approximately 70%; the master/pupil ratio is 1:10. Each grade has 5 classes with approximately 22 boys per class.

Michaelhouse school-leavers write the Independent Examinations Board exams and consistently achieve top results.

The school has produced over 30 Rhodes scholars to study at the University of Oxford and 10 Elsie Ballot scholars to study at the University of Cambridge.

The school hosted the World Individual Debating and Public Speaking Championships in 2002.

The estate and facilities

Pietermaritzburg foundation (1896 to 1902) 
The school was founded in a building in Loop Street, Pietermaritzburg. It had capacity for about 30 boys in total, but it was not long before that became inadequate.

Balgowan estate (from 1902) 

The buildings were started in 1900 and the school took occupation in 1901. The first buildings to be completed were the existing administration block, vestry and gallery of the now extended chapel, and Founders House.

The Michaelhouse Nature Reserve 
The hill overlooking Michaelhouse is one of the rarer biomes in the country (Midlands mistbelt grassland) and is the preferred habitat for an indigenous antelope, the Oribi.

The Estate 
The original school buildings are made of traditional Pietermaritzburg red brick. The entire school is built in a lattice of quadrangles. It is in fact possible to move from one end of the school buildings to the other without ever having to get wet on a rainy day.

Virtual Tour of the Estate 
Here is a virtual tour https://www.michaelhouse.org/about/virtual-tour/

Boarding houses 
There are ten boarding houses. The house system was put in place by Rector Warin Bushell in 1928. Initially, four houses were established but as the school grew the number of houses increased. These are, in order of age, with foundation date in brackets:

Founders (1928, formerly called "Rector's" and "Foundation North")
East (1928, formerly called "Foundation East")
West (1928, formerly called "Foundation West")
Farfield (1928)
Tatham (1935, formerly called "Tathams")
Pascoe (1940)
Baines (1956)
Mackenzie (1995)
Ralfe (2020)
McCormick (2020)

Each boarding house houses about 70 boys in dormitories of four to twelve for the younger boys and in double and single rooms for the senior boys.

The boys share two dining halls (one for senior boys and one for juniors) for their meals and are supplied by a kitchen, with an on-site bakery and butchery.

The chapel 
The chapel is an important focal point in the school's architecture and ethos. The chapel was built running from North to South with the apse at the North end.

In the 1940s, however, the chapel was no longer big enough to fit the entire school in for a service. Thus the chapel was extended towards the East. Because of World War II, the chapel was only finished in the 1950s. A memorial to those who died in World War II is outside the entrance to the chapel.

The original chapel now forms the gallery and vestry. The apse of the old chapel is used as a baptism font. The extended chapel can seat nearly 600 people. Beneath the new chapel is a crypt which is used for smaller prayer meetings and services. The crypt can seat 30 people.

The stained glass windows featured in the Sir Herbert Baker designed chapel, include the Michaelhouse rose window, created by Ervin Bossanyi depicting the head of Christ surrounded by the birds of Natal Province at the rear of the chapel. There is also a series of lancet windows in the sanctuary by Margaret Agnes Rope depicting the Virgin and child, flanked by the Archangels Michael and Gabriel and Samuel as a boy, King David as a young man, John the Baptist as a child and the boy with the loaves and fishes. The pews are made of solid teak.

The chapel has a bell-tower, installed in the 1950s with a carillon of eight bells. It has been a tradition (with unknown origins) that only boys from Tatham House may ring the bells. The bells are rung before each chapel service (there are three services a week, although not all are compulsory).

The Schlesinger Theatre 
A 550-seat theatre was built and completed in 1976. It was opened at a ceremony by Elizabeth Sneddon in 1976. The theatre hosts a variety of performances, mainly aimed at the resident population of pupils. However, the theatre is open to the local community. Many performers give a one night performance on their way between runs in Johannesburg and Durban.

The Schlesinger theatre is one of a number of facilities at the school that was funded by an old boy.

The Indoor Centre 
The construction of the Inglis Indoor Centre was finally completed in the month of August 2006. It is named after James Inglis, a past chairman of the Board of Governors. In summer it is used for basketball and cricket and has three courts that can be used simultaneously as well as 4 indoor turf cricket nets, whilst during winter it is used for indoor hockey.

The centre also features a cafeteria/restaurant which is available to the pupils as well as the public, and accommodation for visiting teams to stay overnight.

Other features 
The library is stocked with over 16,000 books and has an adjoining 50 seat lecture theatre. There are four Science laboratories, three Biology laboratories and four computer centres. The school has a sanatorium and laundry service. The staff reside on the estate.

Sporting facilities 
There are 11 playing fields:
Willows - named after the Willow trees that stand along its length.
Vlei - an Afrikaans name meaning marsh or bog. This is because of the field's affinity for flooding during heavy rains.
Meadows - used as the main rugby field.
Far Meadows - adjacent to Meadows
Holleys
Tarpeys - grew millet during World War II to feed the school.
Baileys - the former main rugby field. Moved to Meadows when seating the hundreds of fans on its small banks became a problem
Aitkens Astroturf - formerly a grass pitch, the astroturf was completed in 2001.
Punchbowl Astroturf -It was a junior cricket oval,the new astroturf was completed in 2019.
Hannahs - a senior cricket oval.
Roy Gathorne Oval - the first team's cricket oval, named after Roy Gathorne.

These include six turf cricket pitches, two artificial astroturf hockey surfaces, a heated swimming pool (12 lanes by 25 metres), a heated water polo pool, eight tennis courts, a weight training facility, a six court squash complex, a golf driving range with artificial putting green, an indoor sports centre (used primarily for basketball and indoor hockey - the facility also houses four artificial surface indoor cricket practice nets) and a dam for canoeing.

Hosting of Paraguay national football team 
The nearby Woodridge Estate hosted the Paraguay team for the 2010 FIFA World Cup, and Michaelhouse was chosen to be the team's training base for the tournament.

Alumni organisation 
Since the school was founded in 1896, it has produced approximately 8700 alumni. Around 6650 are living. Alumni are members of the Michaelhouse Old Boys' Club. The Club was founded on Whit Monday, 1 June 1903. The School's Founder (Reverend James Cameron Todd) was the Club's first President. The Club is headquartered in the Heritage Centre on the school campus.

It has a global presence with 11 regional branches and 16 regional affiliations across six continents.

The Old Boys' Club is driven by its Club for Life mantra. The mantra seeks to create an environment to: ask for help, offer help, share knowledge, share memories, do good business and be a force for good in the world.

Notable alumni 
The year of matriculation is given in brackets, where it is known.

Rennie Airth (1952), novelist
Dale Benkenstein (1992), Dolphins, Proteas and Durham cricket player, Proteas batting coach.
Stephen Bird, Australian sprint canoeist, represented Australia at the 2012 Summer Olympics and the 2016 Summer Olympics
Rupert Bromley, 10th Bt. (1952), Rhodes scholar and businessman
David H.M.Brooks (1967), philosopher and author of "The Unity of the Mind"
Peter Brown (1941), activist and founding member of the Liberal Party
Michael Cassidy (1953) - evangelist
Pat Cilliers (2005), Sharks, Lions, Stormers and Springbok rugby player
Ruan Combrinck (2008), Lions and Springbok rugby player
Sir John Craven, director of Reuters and Deutsche Bank
Ross Cronjé, Lions and Springbok rugby player
Robbie Diack (2003), Ulster Rugby and Ireland Rugby Union footballer, formerly of Western Province
Patrick Dorehill (1938), Royal Air Force bomber pilot - flew the daring Augsburg raid in 1942.
George Ellis (Cantab) (1955), scientist and author (co-written book with Stephen Hawking)
Sir John Fieldsend, the first Chief Justice of Zimbabwe
Nicholas Folker (1994), South African swimmer, represented SA at the 1999 All-Africa Games and the 2000 Summer Olympics
Henry Fotheringham (1970), a retired South African cricketer who played in seven unofficial Test matches and fifteen unofficial One Day Internationals
Warrick Fynn, cricketer
John Harker (1972), retired Natal and Springbok swimmer
Chick Henderson (1947), rugby union footballer and commentator
Giles Henderson (1958), Master of Pembroke College, Oxford
Paul Hepker (1984), film composer (Tsotsi)
Craig Higginson, International novelist and playwright
Robert Holmes à Court, entrepreneur and Australia's first billionaire
Patrick Howard, Western Province, Munster and Newport Gwent Dragons rugby player
Patrick Lambie (2008), Sharks and Springbok rugby player
Sir Ian Lloyd (Cantab), British politician and Conservative MP
Tufty Mann, former South African cricketer
Don MacLeod (Oxon), Natal cricketer and chairman of Illovo Sugar
Colin Melville, cricketer and schoolmaster, later taught at Michaelhouse
Alan Melville, Captain South African cricket team.
Paul Nash (1964), a South African sprinter who tied the 100-metre world record four times in 1968 with a time of 10.0 seconds.
Chris Nicholson, High Court judge in the Natal Provincial Division who declared charges against Jacob Zuma were unlawful
Gary Ralfe (1961), former managing director of De Beers
Michael Rhodes, Stormers and Saracens rugby player
Mark Richards, South African Sevens rugby player
Andrew Robertson (1977), President & CEO of BBDO
Desmond Sacco (1958), Chairman of Assore
David 'the Kiffness' Scott (2005), musician
Richard Scott, Baron Scott of Foscote (1951), British barrister and judge
Wilbur Smith (1950), bestselling novelist
Barry Streek, political journalist and anti-apartheid activist
Rex Tremlett, gold prospector
Paul Trewhela, journalist, communist and political prisoner 
John van de Ruit (1993), playwright and author of Spud
Timothy Woods (1961), schoolmaster
Jean van der Westhuyzen (2017), Australian canoeist, 2020 Summer Olympics gold medalist

Michaelhouse today 
The ideals of the founder, James Cameron Todd, are maintained. He said "Our aim is to make, not accountants, not clerks, not doctors, not clergymen, but men of understanding, thought and culture".

Michaelhouse is a member of the Independent Schools Association of Southern Africa and the Headmasters' and Headmistresses' Conference.

Michaelhouse is also the school in which the novel Spud, by alumnus John van de Ruit, takes place. The movie version was also shot here.

Feeder schools 
Clifton Preparatory School, Nottingham Road, KwaZulu-Natal
Highbury Preparatory School, KwaZulu-Natal
Cordwalles Preparatory School, KwaZulu-Natal
Clifton School, Durban
The Ridge School, Gauteng
Pridwin Preparatory School, Gauteng
Cowan House Preparatory School, KwaZulu-Natal
Merchiston Preparatory School, Kwazulu-Natal
Waterkloof House Preparatory School, Gauteng
St. Peter's Preparatory School, Gauteng
Durban Preparatory High School, KwaZulu-Natal
St. Davids Preparatory School, Gauteng
St. Peter's Preparatory School, Gauteng

See also 
List of boarding schools

References

External links 

Michaelhouse Old Boys' Club
ISASA Schools Directory

Boys' schools in South Africa
Anglican schools in South Africa
Boarding schools in South Africa
Private schools in KwaZulu-Natal
Educational institutions established in 1896
Member schools of the Headmasters' and Headmistresses' Conference
1896 establishments in the Colony of Natal
Herbert Baker buildings and structures